σ Pegasi, Latinised as Sigma Pegasi, is a binary star system in the northern constellation of Pegasus. With a combined apparent visual magnitude of 5.16, it is faintly visible to the naked eye. Based upon an annual parallax shift of 36.66 mas as seen from Earth, the system is located 89 light years distant from the Sun. It has a relatively high proper motion, advancing across the celestial sphere at the rate of 0.524 arcseconds per year.

The primary, component A, is a yellow-white hued F-type main-sequence star with a stellar classification of F6 V. However, Frasca et al. (2009) lists it as a somewhat more evolved F-type subgiant star with a class of F7 IV. At the age of 2.7 billion years, it has an inactive chromosphere and is spinning with a leisurely projected rotational velocity of 3 km/s. It has a faint, magnitude 13.23 red dwarf companion, designated component B, at an angular separation of 248 arc seconds. The system is most likely (96% chance) a member of the thin disk population of the Milky Way.

References

External links

F-type subgiants
F-type main-sequence stars
M-type main-sequence stars
Binary stars
Pegasus (constellation)
Pegasi, Sigma
Durchmusterung objects
Pegasi, 49
216385
112935
8697